The Simca Alvorada was a stripped version of the Simca Chambord automobile, the first model to be built by Simca do Brasil.

The Chambord, which was a direct copy of the French built Simca Vedette, had first left the production line in March 1959 and featured an  engine, 3 speed gearbox with the shifter located on the steering column and was assembled with parts imported from France. It was a large car, manufactured until 1969 in different versions (including the Alvorada) and styled by the Brazilian subsidiary of French automaker Simca at their factory in São Bernardo do Campo, Brazil.

Alvorada - a name with a vengeance
The Simca Alvorada was a radically stripped down version based on the posh Simca Chambord as a result of a demand by the Brazilian government of president Juscelino Kubitcheck that every car manufacturer must offer an affordable basic version within their range. The idea was to give as many Brazilians as possible the possibility to own a car. The concept of a stripped down version of the Simca Vedette had been previously attempted in Simca's home country France, with the Simca Ariane.

While this was welcome news for Volkswagen, for example, Simca do Brasil was not exactly pleased with the idea as the brand had established itself comfortably in the luxury car sector in a way that Simca back in Europe never managed. However, despite having no plans to launch a cheap car and with no other options left, Simca do Brasil decided reluctantly to create an entry level version of their successful Simca Chambord.

The Simca Alvorada appeared in 1963 with just two colours as option (grey and a faded yellow), no chrome, no trimmings and a very simple interior. As a silent protest the car was named after the place the order to create this model came from: The Palácio da Alvorada, the presidential palace in the capital Brasilia.

Production figures
 1963 - 1964 = 378 units

References 

 "Automóveis Brasileiros" by author Enio Brandenburg, FBVA, Rio de Janeiro – Brasil
"The Automobile in South America - The Origins (Argentina, Brazil, Paraguay, Uruguay)" by author Álvaro Casal Tatlock, FBVA, Rio de Janeiro – Brasil
"Automóveis de São Paulo" by author Malcolm Forest, FBVA, Rio de Janeiro – Brasil

External links
/  Simca Club Brazil

Alvorado
Cars introduced in 1963